Harbor Hills can refer to:
Harbor Hills, New York
Harbor Hills, Ohio